Gypsy Curse (Spanish: Maldición gitana) is a 1953 Spanish comedy film directed by Jerónimo Mihura and starring Luis Sandrini, Elena Espejo and Julia Caba Alba.

Synopsis 
Alejo Franchinelli is a widowed violinist whose mother-in-law, Doña Encarna, continually threatens him by sending him telegrams every month. Upon remarrying, his new mother-in-law makes his life miserable. One day the spirit of Doña Encarna appears to him, who assures him that she has died and, although she still has a dislike for him, she now wants to help him to get him to forgive her. Alejo confirms the death of his first mother-in-law and suddenly everything starts to go well for him, until he starts getting into trouble and asks Doña Encarna not to help him any more.

Cast
 María Arias 
 Josefina Bejarano
 Francisco Bernal 
 Julia Caba Alba as Doña Alfonsa  
 Gaspar de Aquino 
 Carlos Díaz de Mendoza 
 Elena Espejo as Elvira  
 Félix Fernández 
 Miguel Ángel Fernández
 Manuel Guitián
 Casimiro Hurtado 
 Delia Luna 
 Arturo Marín 
 Juanjo Menéndez 
 Elisa Méndez 
 Juan Olaguivel 
 Rosa Palomar 
 Carmen Pérez Gallo 
 Santiago Rivero 
 Dora Sancho 
 Eduardo Sandrini 
 Luis Sandrini as Alejo Franchinelli  
 Mercedes Serrano 
 Ricardo Turia
 Aníbal Vela

References

Bibliography 
 de España, Rafael. Directory of Spanish and Portuguese film-makers and films. Greenwood Press, 1994.

External links 
 

1953 comedy films
Spanish comedy films
1953 films
1950s Spanish-language films
Films directed by Jerónimo Mihura
Suevia Films films
Films scored by Juan Quintero Muñoz
Spanish black-and-white films
1950s Spanish films